István Péter Németh (Hungarian: Németh István Péter) is a Hungarian poet and literary historian.

Early life
Németh was born on 8 March 1960 in Tapolca, Hungary.

Books, poem booklets
 Virágnyi világvég (versek, Budapest, 1987.)
 A szerepek hűsége (irodalmi tanulmányok, Veszprém, 1989.)
 Utak szeptembere (versek, Budapest, 1990.)
 Batsányiné Baumberg Gabriella versei (műfordítások, Tapolca, 1992.)
 …a természet örömkönnye (balatoni antológia, Vörösberény, 1993.)
 Koncz István Magamnak mondom című válogatott verseskötete (szerkesztette s gondozta - Tapolca, 1995.)
 Origósdi (mesék - Kamarás Istvánnal közösen - Tapolca, 1996.)
 Angyalvihánc Manophülében (gyermekversek, Tapolca, 1996.)
 Égi tetszésre - idelenn (a Balaton Akadémia könyvsorozatának repertóriuma, Vörösberény, 1996.)
 Heine-daloskönyv (Tapolca, 1997.)
 A boglári parton Adalékok Balatonboglár irodalom és művelődéstörténetéhez. Balaton Akadémia könyvek (szerkesztette - 1998.)
 Borággal áldlak - magyar bordaloskönyv - Balaton Akadémia könyvek (szerkesztette - 1999.)
 Pannónia dicsérete - előadások a II. magyar írók, műfordítók világtalálkozóján Balaton Akadémia könyvek (szerkesztette - 1999.)
 Kamarás István: Világverseny a berekben Németh István Péter verseivel (Cicero Könyvkiadó, 1999.)
 Herbert Zinkl: Esőének (műfordítások, Balatonfüred, 1999.)
 Koldus és királyfi (meseopera-librettó, Balatonfüred, 2000.)
 100 vers (versek, Tapolca, 2000.)
 Kihullt lapok egy naplóból (naplók, följegyzések, Baláca Könyvek, Veszprém, 2000.)
 Rilke-képeskönyv  (műfordítások, Balatonfüred, 2000.)
 Gyöngytár és teklatéka (versek, Tapolca, 2001.)
 Egry ragyogása (versantológia a magyar költők Egry Józsefhez írott verseiből, Balatonőszöd, 2001.)
 Karácsonyi irka (versek és műfordítások, Zánka, 2001.)
 Janus-irka Janus Pannonius 50 epigrammája NIP műfordításában/átköltésében

DVDs
 Öleljen Föld, víz s ég! (balatoni irka Nagy Gáspár emlékének, 2007.)
 Megtaláljon a Karácsony! (karácsonyi versek orgonás zenei aláfestéssel, 2007.)
 Húsvéti oratórium (húsvéti verses DVD, 2008.)
 Angyalvihánc Manophülében (gyermekversek, 2008.)

Recognition
 Egry József országos pályázat, II. hely - Badacsony, 1976.
 Egry József országos pályázat, I.hely - Badacsony, 1977.
 Baraxa-Soós Alapítvány díja, 1985.
 FMK országos versíró pályázat, Bp., I. hely
 B.A.Z. megye jubileumi irodalmi pályázat, Miskolc, 1987., III. hely
 IRAT irodalmi nívódíj első verses kötetéért, Bp., 1989.
 Pedagógusként végzett önképzéséért Fonay-díj, Veszprém, 1990.
 Az Élet és Irodalom bordalversenye, III. díj, Budapest, 1992.
 Salvatore Quasimodo költői verseny, különdíj, Balatonfüred, 1994.
 Salvatore Quasimodo költői versenyben a legjobb 12 között, 1998.
 Országos Illyés Gyula-pályázat a költő 100. születésnapján. Magyar Kultúra Háza, Bp., Corvin tér. Tanulmánya a legjobb 10 között, a Móricz Zsigmond Társaság különdíja, 2002.
 A "Tapolca városért" kitüntetettje, 2001.

Notable citations
 Lurkós líra, mackós poézis
 Németh István Péter - Költészet napi Könyvszemle
 Gyöngytár és teklatéka
 Gondolatok Németh István Péter Mit hoztál – Tűnődések a tájhazáról című könyvének olvasása közben
 Remény, kézírásban

Beyond journal articles on the works of Németh, several citations appear also on the internet, e.g. Arácsi anakreon, Balatoni haikuk, or A műfordítás fényűzése
.

Media appearances

References

1960 births
Living people
20th-century Hungarian poets
Hungarian male poets
21st-century Hungarian poets
20th-century Hungarian male writers
21st-century Hungarian male writers